Final standings of the Hungarian League 1945 Spring season

Final standings

Results

Statistical leaders

Top goalscorers

External links
 IFFHS link

Nemzeti Bajnokság I seasons
Hun
1945–46 in Hungarian football
Hun
1944–45 in Hungarian football